Kurhani railway station is a railway station on the Muzaffarpur–Hajipur section in East Central Railway under Sonpur railway division of Indian Railways. The railway station is situated beside National Highway 22 at Kurhani in Muzaffarpur district of the Indian state of Bihar.

References

Railway stations in Muzaffarpur district
Sonpur railway division